Fojnica Armorial is a prominent Illyrian armorial which contains South Slavic heraldic symbols, and expresses romantic nationalism and Illyrism rather than historical accuracy. The manuscript is named after the Franciscan monastery in Fojnica where it was kept.

Dating
 Radiocarbon dating of the Armorial from 2016 by which two samples were dated have concluded: thick paper, cal 1635–1662, and thin paper, cal AD 1695–1917.
Alexander Soloviev dated it to in between 1675 and 1688, i.e. in the context of the revolts against Ottoman rule during the Great Turkish War.
Other scholars have proposed dates of the late 16th or early 17th century.

Importance
The manuscript is an important source of the classical heraldry of South Slavic Southeast Europe, alongside the Korenić-Neorić Armorial of 1595, and the "Illyrian Armorial" (Society of Antiquaries of London MS.54) collected by Edward Bourchier, 4th Earl of Bath before 1637.

Roll
The manuscript contains a total of 139 coats of arms. It begins with a depiction of the Bogorodica, saints Cosmas and Damian,  and Saint Jerome. There follows a title page, written in Cyrillic, which attributes the work to one Stanislav Rubčić, in honour of King Stefan Dušan, with the date 1340.  The date of 1340 is result of pseudepigraphy. There is an added note in Latin, dated 1800, which testifies that the manuscript had been kept in Fojnica monastery "from time immemorial". Then there is as page showing a combined coat of arms consisting of eleven parts. After this, there are ten coats of arms of late medieval realms of the region, Macedonia (Macedoniae),  "Illyria" (Vllvriae),  Bosnia (Bosnae), Dalmatia (Dalmatie), Croatia (Crovatiae), Slavonia (Slavoniae), Bulgaria (Bvlgariae), Serbia (Svrbiae),  Rascia (Rasciae) and "Primordia" (Primordiae), followed by coats of arms of noble families.

See also
Coat of arms
Coat of arms of Bosnia
Coat of arms of Bulgaria
Coat of arms of Croatia
Coat of arms of Serbia
Coat of arms of North Macedonia
Proposed coat of arms of North Macedonia
Croatian chequy
Croatian heraldry
Serbian cross
Serb heraldry
Rise of nationalism under the Ottoman Empire

References

Sources
B. Belović, O heraldičkom spomeniku u Fojničkom manastiru (a heraldic monument from  Fojnica monastery"), Zastava, 59/1928, 100, 3, 101, 3.
Dubravko Lovrenović, Fojnički grbovnik, ilirska heraldika i bosansko srednjovjekovlje ("the Fojnica Armorial, Illyrian heraldry and mediaeval Bosnia"), Bosna Franciscana, br. 21, god. XII, Sarajevo, 2004, 172-202.
FOJNIČKI GRBOVNIK = THE FOJNICA ARMORIAL ROLL (facsimile edition), Rabic, 2005, .

External links

FOJNIČKI GRBOVNIK - Recommended for concise historical notes for every family coat of arms (in Bosnian) 
Fojnica.de
Ciode.ca
Heraldika Srbija

Rolls of arms
Illyrian movement
Serbian heraldry
Croatian coats of arms
Bosnia and Herzegovina coats of arms
Bulgarian coats of arms
Illuminated heraldic manuscripts